Ronald Charles Irani (born 26 October 1971) is a former England cricketer who played Tests and ODIs for England. He played only three Tests for England, with decidedly mixed success, but found a niche in One Day Internationals, where he gained much praise for his performances.

He spent most of his career at Essex County Cricket Club, latterly as captain, after starting at Lancashire. He is of Irani descent, the Iranis being a community of Persian Zoroastrians who immigrated to India during the British Raj.

Irani was a genuine all-rounder until a knee injury in 2003 forced him to stop bowling and play as a specialist batsman. The recurring nature of this injury led to Irani being forced to retire from first-class cricket in June 2007. At Essex, Irani helped bring through promising players such as Alastair Cook (England Captain) and Ravinder Bopara (England Player) as well as winning two major One-Day Titles. Professionally he scored over 20,000 runs and took more than 650 wickets during his career.

He announced his retirement from first-class cricket at the end of the 2007 season.

Personal life
Irani's father Jimmy Irani arrived in Bolton from Bombay, India in 1961 to play a summer's club cricket. During that summer he met 16-year-old Lancastrian Anne Main. The two married and had a son, Ronnie. Jimmy Irani was an enthusiastic, successful and prolific club cricketer with Daisy Hill in the Bolton Association who often put up overseas players, such as Farokh Engineer and Javed Miandad, during Ronnie's childhood.

Domestic career

He started his career playing for Lancashire in 1990, before he moved to Essex in 1994. At Essex, he gained cult status,  before he became captain in 2000, and is generally accepted to have done a decent job in charge, helping to bring through promising players such as Alastair Cook, Will Jefferson and Ravi Bopara. After Graham Gooch stepped down as the club's head coach prior to the start of the 2005 season, Irani assumed some of these responsibilities in addition to his role as county captain.

In June 2007, he rejected a new contract with Essex and announced his retirement from first-class cricket at the end of the 2007 season. He retired with immediate effect later that month.

International career
Irani was awarded Fans' player of the series in Natwest Series 2002 featuring India and Sri Lanka for his allround performance. He scored 169 runs and took 8 wickets in the tri-series.

After retirement
After his retirement, he took on a position at talkSPORT in 2007, where he co-hosted, until 2013 when he was sacked live on air, The Alan Brazil Sports Breakfast with former Scottish international footballer Alan Brazil. On this show, he picked up the nickname Chicken from the dish Chicken Biriyani rhyming with his surname. Following Irani's appointment, the show's audience increased, reaching 1.2 million listeners by May 2008. During his time at talkSPORT, Irani also appeared as a guest on the BBC quiz show A Question of Sport.

In 2009 Irani's autobiography "No Boundaries" was published. He was also  part of a celebrity 'consortium' (along with Radio 2 DJ Chris Evans) who clubbed together to pay for Paul Gascoigne to receive treatment for alcoholism in the US.

In 2015, Irani took up the position of Cricket Committee Chairman at Essex and expressed his desire for the club to improve its performances. Irani was quoted as saying that, “We are still talented and it is great to see young players coming through like Nick Browne, Tom Westley and Jamie Porter. We have to make sure we keep doing that, while getting Essex back to the level that we were in years gone by, knocking on doors and trying to win trophies.”

After having held the position of chairman for several months, Irani said that, “I am really enjoying it. I love Essex Cricket Club and it is a pleasure to work there. The people know and love their cricket and they have always got behind the team as well which is important. It is an exciting time to be part of the club as it is certainly going places and we are more than capable of winning things."

In addition to his duties at Essex, Irani is also the co-founder/inventor of OrthoSole,  an orthotic insole that is customizable by the owner, making it considerably more affordable than other custom-made alternatives on the market.

Personality
He is known by many sports fans for an "Exercise Routine” during an England One-Day International in Australia. He was doing a warm-up while fielding, and unbeknown to Irani, the Australian fans were imitating his routine behind his back. When he discovered what they were doing, he played up to the tens of thousands of fans and became quicker as to make the fans carry on even more.

Irani is a long time supporter of Manchester United, after being taken to games by his father when he was a child.

References

External links 
 

1971 births
Living people
England One Day International cricketers
England Test cricketers
English cricketers
Essex cricketers
Essex cricket captains
Lancashire cricketers
Sportspeople from Leigh, Greater Manchester
English people of Indian descent
British sportspeople of Indian descent
British Asian cricketers
Irani people
British Zoroastrians
First-Class Counties Select XI cricketers